Werner Erhard and Associates, also known as WE&A or as WEA, operated as a commercial entity from February 1981 until early 1991. It replaced Erhard Seminars Training, Inc. as the vehicle for delivering the est training, and offered what some people refer to as  personal
and professional development programs. Initially WE&A marketed and staged the est training (in the form of the est seminars and workshops), but in 1984 the est training was replaced by WE&A with a more modern, briefer, rigorous and philosophical program - based on Werner Erhard's teachings and called  "The Forum".

In 1991 Erhard sold the assets of WE&A to a group of employees, who later formed Landmark Education. Erhard then retired
and left the United States.

Timeline 

 February 1981: Werner Erhard and Associates (WE&A) set up.
 1984: WE&A replaces the est training with "The Forum".
 1991: Erhard sold the assets of WE&A to a group of employees who later formed Landmark Education.

The Forum

Evaluations

Objective studies 
A scientific study conducted by a team of psychology professors concluded that attending the Forum had minimal lasting effects — positive or negative — on participants.
The research won an American Psychological Association "National Psychological Consultants to Management Award" in 1989.

The results of the research study appeared in two articles in the Journal of Consulting and Clinical Psychology in 1989 and in 1990, and in 1990 in a book titled Evaluating a Large Group Awareness Training.

Subjective surveys 
The abstract of Charles Denison's PhD dissertation for the College of Education (University of Denver), "The Children of est: A Study of the Experience and Perceived Effects of a Large Group Awareness Training (the Forum)", reported that the Forum had a definite structure, curriculum, and pedagogical approach. Denison's study identified the primary concepts of The Forum, called "distinctions".  Denison's data indicate that qualitatively significant results were produced in participants' self-assessed functioning in cognitive, affective, and behavioral domains. Most participants attributed significant life effects to their  experience.

Public-opinion analyst Daniel Yankelovich did an investigation of the response of participants to their experience of the Forum.  Yankelovich reported that "more than seven out of ten participants found the Forum to be one of their  life's most rewarding experiences".  The study reported that 95 percent of Forum graduates believe the Forum had "specific, practical value" for many aspects of their lives, and 86 percent of those surveyed said that it helped them "cope with a particular challenge or problem".

Conceptual evaluations 
Professor of Communication Studies, Bruce R. Hyde, in his paper "Saying the Clearing: A Heideggerian Analysis of the Ontological Rhetoric of Werner Erhard", discusses the Forum as the beginnings of Erhard's work in developing transformational education utilizing an ontological approach rather than an epistemological approach.

Impact 
One of the more common alleged results of the Forum was the healing of relationships with parents. One facet of this course was to urge participants to stop blaming their parents for their problems and begin to express their natural love for them that was often buried under accumulated resentments.

Many projects to come out of WE&A involved working to foster value, camaraderie and opportunities to serve the community. As an example of this a group of participants in a "High performance" seminar threw a Christmas party at a homeless shelter by planning, preparing, cooking and participating with the people in the shelter. As a result, they came "away with the gift of knowing we are them and they are us, homeless or sheltered, employed or out of work, broke or salaried; we recognize ourselves in their eyes and in their plight."

See also 
 List of large-group awareness training organizations

References

External links

Werner Erhard and Associates
est and Werner Erhard, The Skeptic's Dictionary
Werner Erhard, Wikiquote

Werner Erhard
Large-group awareness training
New Age organizations
Privately held companies based in California
Self religions